Sasha Nathan Petraske (March 16, 1973 – August 21, 2015) was the founder of the New York City cocktail bar Milk & Honey, as well as a partner and creative force behind many of the world's most highly regarded bars.  During his lifetime he was credited with inventing modern cocktail culture.

He was born in Greenwich Village, New York City.  Often described as a savant, Petraske dropped out of Stuvyvesant high school at the age of 17, and never received a formal post-secondary education.  After traveling cross-country, he joined the US Army. He served in Alpha Company 2nd/75th Ranger Regiment and engineered his exit after three years of service by falsely claiming that he was gay.  Following his departure from the army, he tended bar, ultimately opening Milk and Honey.  

His bar was known for its focus on attention-to-detail on classic cocktail recipes and a strict set of "Rules of Etiquette" to ensure a polite and enjoyable drinking experience, while carefully minimizing unnecessary costs and ensuring consistent recipe ratios through adopting the then-usual use of a bartending jigger to ensure precise pours.  Cocktail historian Dale DeGroff described Petraske as a "Solve the problem, common-sense kind of guy."

Petraske was very prolific and together with partners was the creative responsible for dozens of notable venues.  A partial list is included below.  
 Attaboy, NY (2013)
 Bohanans, SaTx (2006)
 Dutch Kills, NY (2009)
 East Side Company Bar, NY (2005)
 Everleigh, Melbourne (2011)
 Little Branch, NY (2005)
 Middle Branch, NY (2012)
 Milk and Honey, London (2002)
 Milk and Honey, NY (1999)
 The Varnish, Los Angeles (2009)
 White Star, NY (2008)
Wm. Farmer & Sons (2015)

In May 2015, Petraske married journalist Georgette Moger.

Death
He was found dead at his home in Hudson, New York on August 21, 2015.

Legacy
Many of the world's top bartenders studied under Petraske magnifying his influence beyond that of any other bartender to date.

Bars around the world memorialized him after his death, toasting him with daiquiris -- a cocktail he loved -- at 9pm local time on August 31, 2015, in honor of the traditional evening hour of Milk and Honey's opening.

His wife, Georgette Moger-Petraske, compiled his writings after his death in a book, Regarding Cocktails, that contained many of his innovative recipes as well as selected writings on the art of cocktail-making and tending bar.

See also
 Craft cocktail movement

References

1973 births
2015 deaths
Businesspeople from New York (state)
People from Hudson, New York
American bartenders
Drinking establishment owners
21st-century American businesspeople
20th-century American businesspeople